Nyoro may refer to:

 Nyoro people, residing in the area of the former kingdom of Bunyoro
 Nyoro language
 A catch phrase used by Tsuruya in the Haruhi Suzumiya franchise